Eric Mobley (February 1, 1970 – June 2, 2021) was an American professional basketball player who played three seasons in the National Basketball Association (NBA). He was selected by the Milwaukee Bucks in the first round (18th pick overall) of the 1994 NBA draft. A 6'11" center from Allegany Community College and the University of Pittsburgh, Mobley played in three NBA seasons for the Bucks and Vancouver Grizzlies. In his three-year career, Mobley appeared in 113 games and averaged 3.9 points, 3.1 rebounds, 0.5 assists, 0.2 steals, and 0.5 blocks per game. He died on June 2, 2021, from cancer.

Career statistics

NBA

|-
| align="left" | 1994–95
| align="left" | Milwaukee
| 46 || 26 || 12.8 || .591 || 1.000 || .489 || 3.3 || 0.5 || 0.2 || 0.6 || 3.9
|-
| align="left" | 1995–96
| align="left" | Milwaukee
| 5 || 3 || 13.0 || .286 || .000 || .500 || 2.4 || 0.0 || 0.2 || 0.2 || 1.2
|-
| align="left" | 1995–96
| align="left" | Vancouver
| 34 || 1 || 18.0 || .550 || .500 || .446 || 3.8 || 0.6 || 0.4 || 0.7 || 5.4
|-
| align="left" | 1996–97
| align="left" | Vancouver
| 28 || 8 || 11.0 || .444 || .000 || .533 || 2.1 || 0.5 || 0.2 || 0.4 || 2.6
|- class="sortbottom"
| style="text-align:center;" colspan="2"| Career
| 113 || 38 || 13.9 || .541 || .750 || .475 || 3.1 || 0.5 || 0.2 || 0.5 || 3.9
|}

College

|-
| align="left" | 1991–92
| align="left" | Pittsburgh
| 33 || - || 16.4 || .559 || - || .410 || 4.6 || 0.6 || 0.4 || 1.7 || 7.2
|-
| align="left" | 1992–93
| align="left" | Pittsburgh
| 28 || - || 26.8 || .542 || - || .553 || 7.5 || 1.8 || 0.3 || 1.9 || 10.4
|-
| align="left" | 1993–94
| align="left" | Pittsburgh
| 27 || - || 29.6 || .568 || - || .492 || 8.8 || 2.0 || 0.7 || 2.8 || 13.7
|- class="sortbottom"
| style="text-align:center;" colspan="2"| Career
| 88 || - || 23.8 || .557 || - || .486 || 6.8 || 1.4 || 0.5 || 2.1 || 10.2
|}

References

External links

1970 births
2021 deaths
African-American basketball players
Allegany Trojans men's basketball players
American expatriate basketball people in Canada
American men's basketball players
Basketball players from New York City
Centers (basketball)
Milwaukee Bucks draft picks
Milwaukee Bucks players
Parade High School All-Americans (boys' basketball)
Pittsburgh Panthers men's basketball players
Sportspeople from the Bronx
Vancouver Grizzlies players
20th-century African-American sportspeople
21st-century African-American sportspeople